Utah State Route 207 may refer to:

 Utah State Route 207 (1945-1968), a former state highway in eastern Uintah County, Utah, United States
 Utah State Route 207 (1941-1945)